Tetrernia tetrommata is a moth in the family Crambidae. It was described by George Hampson in 1906. It is found on the Louisiade Archipelago in Papua New Guinea.

References

Acentropinae
Moths described in 1906